The discography of South Korean boy band VIXX, formed by Jellyfish Entertainment consists of five studio albums, five extended plays (EPs), ten single albums and twenty-six singles.

Albums

Studio albums

Single albums

Compilation albums

Extended plays

Singles

As lead artist
{| class="wikitable plainrowheaders" style="text-align:center"
! scope="col" rowspan="2"| Title
! scope="col" rowspan="2"| Year
! scope="col" colspan="5"| Peak chart positions
! scope="col" rowspan="2"| Sales
! scope="col" rowspan="2"| Album
|-
! scope="col" style="width:3em;font-size:90%"|KOR
! scope="col" style="width:3em;font-size:90%"|KORHot
! scope="col" style="width:3em;font-size:90%"|JPN
! scope="col" style="width:3em;font-size:90%"|JPNHot
! scope="col" style="width:3em;font-size:90%"|USWorld
|-
!colspan="9"| Korean
|-
!scope="row"|"Super Hero"
|rowspan="2"|2012
| 112 || — || — || — || —
|
KOR : 64,195+
|Super Hero
|-
!scope="row"|"Rock Ur Body"
| 118 || 83 || — || — || —
|
KOR : 46,489+
|Rock Ur Body
|-
!scope="row"|"On and On" 
|rowspan="5"|2013
| 25 || 96 || — || — || — 
|
KOR : 159,157+
|On and On
|-
!scope="row"|"Hyde"
| 35 || 57 ||  — || — || 6
|
KOR : 183,354+
|Hyde
|-
!scope="row"|"G.R.8.U" 
| 14 || 13 || — || — || 10
|
KOR : 215,760+
|Jekyll
|- 
!scope="row"|"Only U" 
| 40 || 42 || — || — || 8
|
KOR : 76,294+
|rowspan="2"|Voodoo
|-
!scope="row"|"Voodoo Doll" 
| 7 || 53 || — || — || 4
|
KOR : 170,170+
|-
!scope="row"|"Turn Around And Look At Me" 
|rowspan="3"|2014
| 71 || 87 || — || — || — 
| 
|DEUX 20th AnniversaryTribute Album Part.7
|-
!scope="row"|"Eternity" 
| 7 || 25 || — || — || 3
|
KOR : 234,119+
|Eternity
|- 
!scope="row"|"Error"
| 5 ||rowspan="8"  || — || — || 4
|
KOR : 187,111+
|Error
|- 
!scope="row"|"Love Equation" 
|rowspan="2"|2015
| 2 || — || — || 9
|
KOR : 282,476+
|Boys' Record
|-
!scope="row"|"Chained Up" 
| 8 || — || — || 4
|
KOR : 185,778+
|Chained Up
|- 
!scope="row"|"Dynamite" 
|rowspan="4"|2016
| 14 || — || — || 4
|
KOR : 181,945+
|Zelos
|- 
!scope="row"|"Fantasy"
| 22 || — || — || 5
|
KOR : 103,704+
|Hades
|- 
!scope="row"|"The Closer"
| 8 || — || — || 14
|
KOR : 99,281+
|Kratos
|- 
!scope="row"|"Milky Way"
| 96 || — || — || —
|
KOR : 14,771+
|VIXX 2016 Conception Ker
|- 
!scope="row"| "Shangri-La" 
|rowspan="1"|2017
| 13 || — || — || 6
|
KOR : 120,390+
|Shangri-La
|- 
!scope="row"| "Scentist" 
|2018
| 74 || 26 || — || — || 6
|rowspan=3 
|Eau de VIXX
|- 
!scope="row"| "Walking" 
|rowspan=2|2019
| — || — || — || — || —
|rowspan="2"
|- 
!scope="row"| "Parallel" 
| — || — || — || — || —
|-
!colspan="9"| Japanese
|- 
!scope="row"|"Error" 
|2014
| — || rowspan="5"  || 6 || 18 || —
|
JPN : 19,381+
|rowspan="3"|Depend on Me
|-
!scope="row"|"Can't Say"
|2015
| — || 4 || 9 || —
|
JPN : 31,289+
|-
!scope="row"|"Depend on Me"
|rowspan="2"|2016
| — || — || — || —
|
|-
!scope="row"| "Hana-Kaze" 
| — || 3 || 3 || —
|
JPN : 26,613+
|
|- 
!scope="row"|"Lalala: Ai o Arigatō" 
|2017
| — || — || — || —
|rowspan=2 
|Lalala: Ai o Arigatō
|- 
!scope="row"|"Reincarnation"
|2018
| — || — || — || — || —
|Reincarnation
|-
!scope="row"|"Aruiteiru" 
|rowspan="2"|2019
| — || — || 21 || — || —
|
JPN : 2,888
|rowspan="2"
|-
!scope="row"|"Parallel"
| — || — || 27 || — || —
|
JPN : 2,077
|-
!colspan="10"| Chinese
|- 
!scope="row"| "Destiny Love" 
|rowspan="3"| 2015 
| — ||rowspan="3"  || — || — || —
|rowspan="3" 
|Boys' Record
|-
!scope="row"|"Error" 
| — || — || — || —
|rowspan="2" 
|-
!scope="row"|"Chained Up" 
| — || — || — || —
|- 
|colspan="9" style="font-size:8pt"|"—" denotes releases that did not chart or were not released in that region.Note: Gaon Music Chart no longer releases download sales figures from January 2018 onward.Note: ''Billboards Korea K-Pop Hot 100 was introduced in August 2011 and discontinued in July 2014. It was reintroduced on December 20, 2017.
|}

Collaborations

Other charted songs

Soundtrack appearances

Videography

Music videos

Video albums

NotesNotesFootnotes'''

See also
 VIXX LR#Discography
 List of songs recorded by VIXX
 List of awards and nominations received by VIXX

References

External links
 VIXX at Jellyfish Entertainment 
 VIXX Japan Official Site 

Discography
Discographies of South Korean artists
K-pop music group discographies